Marcel Hamelin (born September 18, 1937) is a Canadian historian and a former president of University of Ottawa.

Education 
In 1961, Hemelin earned his Doctor of Letters in History from Laval University.
Hemelin attended Séminaire Sainte-Marie in Shawinigan, Quebec.

Career 
Hamelin served as president of the University of Ottawa from 1990 to 2001. He is a member of the Royal Society of Canada. 

In 1966, Hamelin joined the Faculty of Arts at the University of Ottawa, teaching and serving as chairman in the Department of History. He later held the positions of Vice-Dean of the School of Graduate Studies and Research and Dean of the Faculty of Arts from 1974 to 1990.

Personal life 
Hamelin married Judith Purcell on August 18, 1962 and has three children: Danielle, Christine and Marc

Legacy 
The Arts building at the University of Ottawa is now named after him.

References

1937 births
Living people
Fellows of the Royal Society of Canada
20th-century Canadian historians
Canadian male non-fiction writers
Université Laval alumni
Academic staff of the University of Ottawa
21st-century Canadian historians